Stráž nad Nežárkou is a town in Jindřichův Hradec District in the South Bohemian Region of the Czech Republic. It has about 900 inhabitants. It lies on the Nežárka river.

Administrative parts
Villages of Dolní Lhota and Dvorce are administrative parts of Stráž nad Nežárkou.

Notable people
Friedrich von Berchtold (1781–1876), Austrian botanist

References

External links

 

Cities and towns in the Czech Republic
Populated places in Jindřichův Hradec District